Here is the list of transfers announced. The biggest name to transfer this season is Odafe Onyeka Okolie  who will be paid 1.5 crores (~$320k)

References

Transfers
2011 summer
India